Dona Dumitru Siminică (1926–1979) was a Romanian violinist and singer of lăutar music. He recorded prolifically for the Romanian state record label Electrecord from the late 1950s until the end of his life.

Biography

Siminică was born on 13 September 1926 in Teiș near Târgoviște, a small city not far from Bucharest, Romania. He was the son of a Roma violinist named Nicolae Siminică, from whom he also learned to play the violin. His father also worked in construction, a trade which Dona Dumitru trained in as well. It was to work in construction that the family relocated to Bucharest.

In the mid 1940s, at age 18 Siminică became the leader of a lautar music group in the Piața Amzei and then after five years he led another in the Piața Sfantul Gheorghe. He became known for his immense repertoire of vocal and instrumental music, including nineteenth century court music and other rare pieces inherited from his family. In 1956 he made his first appearances performing on the radio. In 1958 he then made his first recording for the state record label Electrecord in 1958, accompanied by the orchestra of Radu Voinescu. Thereafter he recorded a long list of 78rpm and 33rpm singles at Electrecord with the orchestras of Aurel Gore, Nicolae Băluță, Ion Mărgean and others. During this time he also collaborated with other singers such as Fărâmiţă Lambru, Maria Tănase or Gabi Luncă.

It was only in 1979 that he finally recorded a full-length LP album Inel, inel de aur with the orchestra of Nicolae Stan.

He died of a heart attack on 27 November 1979 in his apartment in Bucharest. He was 53 years old.

References

Lăutari and lăutărească music
Romanian Romani people
People from Dâmbovița County
20th-century Romanian male singers
20th-century Romanian singers
1926 births
1979 deaths